The Cheney Family Singers was a family—consisting of a sister and four brothers; Moses, Nathaniel, Simeon, Joseph, and Elizabeth— who were early American singers from 1845 to 1847. They were led by Moses Ela Cheney. Walt Whitman reviewed the group in 1845, concluding that they were one of the “American vocal bands that in true music really surpass almost any of the vaunted artificial performers from abroad.” He considered them to have a "refreshing simplicity".

See also 
 Hutchinson Family Singers

References

Further reading 
 
 

American vocal groups
Vocal quintets
Family musical groups